Marengo Gardens is a bungalow court located at the intersection of South Marengo Avenue and Ohio Street in Pasadena, California. The court, which was built in 1913, consists of nine single-family bungalows; six of the houses are centered on a courtyard, while the remaining three face Marengo Avenue. The homes were designed in the American Craftsman style; each house includes various different features of the style, such as shingle or clapboard siding, shallow-sloped gable roofs, decorative brickwork, and buttressed piers.

References

External links

Bungalow courts
Bungalow architecture in California
Houses in Pasadena, California
Houses completed in 1913
Houses on the National Register of Historic Places in California
National Register of Historic Places in Pasadena, California
1913 establishments in California
American Craftsman architecture in California